Sir Francis James Wylie (18 October 1865 – 29 October 1952) was a British university academic and administrator. He was the first Warden of Rhodes House at the University of Oxford, England.

Francis Wylie was educated at St Edward's School, Oxford, the University of Glasgow, and Balliol College, Oxford, where he received a first class degree in Literae Humaniores in 1888. He became a lecturer at Balliol College in 1891 and a Fellow of Brasenose College in 1892. His research was in the area of English literature. He was coauthor of the book, The Poetry of Matthew Arnold; A Commentary.

Wylie was supervisor of the Rhodes Trust scheme at the University of Oxford and became Warden of Rhodes House in Oxford from 1903 to 1931.
He presented Einstein's Blackboard in the Museum of the History of Science in Oxford (saved by University dons on 16 May 1931) after Albert Einstein's series of three lectures at Rhodes House that year.

He was knighted in 1929 and became an Honorary Fellow of Brasenose College in 1931. In 1933, Wylie received an honorary degree from Bowdoin College in the USA.

Wylie's fourth son, born in Oxford, was Shaun Wylie (1913–2009), a mathematician who worked at Bletchley Park during World War II.

A portrait of Sir Francis Wylie hangs in Rhodes House, Oxford, and there are images of him held by the National Portrait Gallery, London.

References

1865 births
1952 deaths
People educated at St Edward's School, Oxford
Alumni of the University of Glasgow
Alumni of Balliol College, Oxford
Fellows of Brasenose College, Oxford
British literary critics
Wardens of Rhodes House
Knights Bachelor